This is a list of bird species confirmed in the Canadian province of Nova Scotia. Unless otherwise noted, the list is that of the Nova Scotia Bird Society (NSBS) as of 2021. The Society's field checklist contains 308 species, some of which are seen regularly but only in small numbers. To that list are added an additional 169 uncommon species from the full NSBS list. Of the resulting 491 species presented here, 246 are accidental and seven were introduced to North America. Birds that are considered probable escapees or to have been released, although they may have been sighted flying free, are not included.

This list is presented in the taxonomic sequence of the Check-list of North and Middle American Birds, 7th edition through the 62nd Supplement, published by the American Ornithological Society (AOS). Common and scientific names are also those of the Check-list, except that Canadian English spellings are used and the common names of families are from the Clements taxonomy because the AOS list does not include them.

 (A) Accidental - a species that rarely or accidentally occurs in Nova Scotia
 (I) Introduced - a species introduced to Nova Scotia as a consequence, direct or indirect, of human actions

Ducks, geese, and waterfowl
Order: AnseriformesFamily: Anatidae

Anatidae includes the ducks and most duck-like waterfowl, such as geese and swans. These birds are adapted to an aquatic existence with webbed feet, bills which are flattened to a greater or lesser extent, and feathers that are excellent at shedding water due to special oils.

Black-bellied whistling-duck, Dendrocygna autumnalis (A) 
Fulvous whistling-duck, Dendrocygna bicolor (A) 
Snow goose, Anser caerulescens 
Ross's goose, Anser rossii (A) 
Greylag goose, Anser anser (A) 
Greater white-fronted goose, Anser albifrons (A) 
Tundra bean-goose, Anser serrirostris (A) 
Pink-footed goose, Anser brachyrhynchus (A) 
Cackling goose, Branta hutchinsii (A) 
Canada goose, Branta canadensis 
Brant, Branta bernicla 
Barnacle goose, Branta leucopsis (A) 
Mute swan, Cygnus olor (I) (A) 
Trumpeter swan, Cygnus buccinator (A) 
Tundra swan, Cygnus columbianus (A) 
Wood duck, Aix sponsa 
Garganey, Spatula querquedula (A) 
Blue-winged teal, Spatula discors 
Cinnamon teal, Spatula cyanoptera (A) 
Northern shoveler, Spatula clypeata 
Gadwall, Mareca strepera  
Eurasian wigeon, Mareca penelope 
American wigeon, Mareca americana 
Mallard, Anas platyrhynchos 
American black duck, Anas rubripes 
Northern pintail, Anas acuta 
Green-winged teal, Anas crecca 
Canvasback, Aythya valisineria (A) 
Redhead, Aythya americana 
Ring-necked duck, Aythya collaris 
Tufted duck, Aythya fuligula (A) 
Greater scaup, Aythya marila 
Lesser scaup, Aythya affinis 
King eider, Somateria spectabilis (A) 
Common eider, Somateria mollissima 
Harlequin duck, Histrionicus histrionicus 
Labrador duck, Camptorhynchus labradorius 
Surf scoter, Melanitta perspicillata 
White-winged scoter, Melanitta deglandi 
Black scoter, Melanitta americana 
Long-tailed duck, Clangula hyemalis 
Bufflehead, Bucephala albeola 
Common goldeneye, Bucephala clangula 
Barrow's goldeneye, Bucephala islandica 
Hooded merganser, Lophodytes cucullatus 
Common merganser, Mergus merganser 
Red-breasted merganser, Mergus serrator 
Ruddy duck, Oxyura jamaicensis (A)

Pheasants, grouse, and allies
Order: GalliformesFamily: Phasianidae

Phasianidae consists of the pheasants and their allies. These are terrestrial species, variable in size but generally plump with broad relatively short wings. Many species are gamebirds or have been domesticated as a food source for humans.

Ruffed grouse, Bonasa umbellus 
Willow ptarmigan, Lagopus lagopus (A) 
Rock ptarmigan, Lagopus mutus (A) 
Spruce grouse, Canachites canadensis 
Grey partridge, Perdix perdix (I) (A) 
Ring-necked pheasant, Phasianus colchicus (I)

Flamingos
Order: PhoenicopteriformesFamily: Phoenicopteridae

Flamingos filter-feed on shellfish and algae. Their oddly shaped beaks are specially adapted to separate mud and silt from the food they consume and, uniquely, are used upside-down.

American flamingo, Phoenicopterus ruber (A)

Grebes
Order: PodicipediformesFamily: Podicipedidae

Grebes are small to medium-large freshwater diving birds. They have lobed toes and are excellent swimmers and divers. However, they have their feet placed far back on the body, making them quite ungainly on land.

Pied-billed grebe, Podilymbus podiceps 
Horned grebe, Podiceps auritus 
Red-necked grebe, Podiceps grisegena 
Eared grebe, Podiceps nigricollis (A) 
Western grebe, Aechmorphorus occidentalis (A)

Pigeons and doves
Order: ColumbiformesFamily: Columbidae

Pigeons and doves are stout-bodied birds with short necks and short slender bills with a fleshy cere. They feed on seeds, fruit and plants. Unlike most other birds, the doves and pigeons produce "crop milk," which is secreted by a sloughing of fluid-filled cells from the lining of the crop. Both sexes produce this highly nutritious substance to feed to the young.

Rock pigeon, Columba livia (I) 
Band-tailed pigeon, Patagioenas fasciata (A) 
Eurasian collared-dove, Streptopelia decaocto (I) 
Passenger pigeon, Ectopistes migratorius  
Common ground dove, Columbina passerina (A) 
White-winged dove, Zenaida asiatica (A) 
Mourning dove, Zenaida macroura

Cuckoos
Order: CuculiformesFamily: Cuculidae

The family Cuculidae includes cuckoos, roadrunners, and anis. These birds are of variable size with slender bodies, long tails, and strong legs.

Yellow-billed cuckoo, Coccyzus americanus 
Black-billed cuckoo, Coccyzus erythropthalmus

Nightjars and allies
Order: CaprimulgiformesFamily: Caprimulgidae

Nightjars are medium-sized nocturnal birds that usually nest on the ground. They have long wings, short legs, and very short bills. Most have small feet, of little use for walking, and long pointed wings. Their soft plumage is cryptically coloured to resemble bark or leaves.

Common nighthawk,  Chordeiles minor 
Chuck-will's-widow, Antrostomus carolinensis (A) 
Eastern whip-poor-will, Antrostomus vociferus (A)

Swifts
Order: ApodiformesFamily: Apodidae

The swifts are small birds which spend the majority of their lives flying. These birds have very short legs and never settle voluntarily on the ground, perching instead only on vertical surfaces. Many swifts have long swept-back wings which resemble a crescent or boomerang.

Chimney swift, Chaetura pelagica

Hummingbirds
Order: ApodiformesFamily: Trochilidae

Hummingbirds are small birds capable of hovering in mid-air due to the rapid flapping of their wings. They are the only birds that can fly backwards.

Ruby-throated hummingbird, Archilochus colubris 
Black-chinned hummingbird, Archilochus alexandri (A) 
Calliope hummingbird, Selasphorus calliope (A) 
Rufous hummingbird, Selasphorus rufus (A) 
Broad-tailed hummingbird, Selasphorus platycercus (A)

Rails, gallinules, and coots
Order: GruiformesFamily: Rallidae

Rallidae is a large family of small to medium-sized birds which includes the rails, crakes, coots, and gallinules. The most typical family members occupy dense vegetation in damp environments near lakes, swamps, or rivers. In general they are shy and secretive birds, making them difficult to observe. Most species have strong legs and long toes which are well adapted to soft uneven surfaces. They tend to have short, rounded wings and to be weak fliers.

Clapper rail, Rallus crepitans (A) 
King rail, Rallus elegans (A) 
Virginia rail, Rallus limicola 
Corn crake, Crex crex (A) 
Sora, Porzana carolina 
Common gallinule, Gallinula galeata (A) 
American coot, Fulica americana 
Purple gallinule, Porphyrio martinicus (A) 
Yellow rail, Coturnicops noveboracensis (A) 
Black rail, Laterallus jamaicensis (A)

Limpkin
Order: GruiformesFamily: Aramidae

The limpkin is an odd bird that looks like a large rail, but is skeletally closer to the cranes. It is found in marshes with some trees or scrub in the Caribbean, South America, and southern Florida.

Limpkin, Aramus guarauna (A)

Cranes
Order: GruiformesFamily: Gruidae

Cranes are large, long-legged and long-necked birds. Unlike the similar-looking but unrelated herons, cranes fly with necks outstretched, not pulled back. Most have elaborate and noisy courting displays or "dances".

Sandhill crane, Antigone canadensis (A)

Stilts and avocets
Order: CharadriiformesFamily: Recurvirostridae

Recurvirostridae is a family of large wading birds which includes the avocets and stilts. The avocets have long legs and long up-curved bills. The stilts have extremely long legs and long, thin, straight bills.

Black-necked stilt, Himantopus mexicanus (A) 
American avocet, Recurvirostra americana (A)

Oystercatchers
Order: CharadriiformesFamily: Haematopodidae

The oystercatchers are large, obvious and noisy plover-like birds, with strong bills used for smashing or prising open molluscs.

American oystercatcher, Haematopus palliatus (A)

Plovers and lapwings
Order: CharadriiformesFamily: Charadriidae

The family Charadriidae includes the plovers, dotterels, and lapwings. They are small to medium-sized birds with compact bodies, short thick necks, and long, usually pointed, wings. They are found in open country worldwide, mostly in habitats near water.

Northern lapwing, Vanellus vanellus (A) 
Black-bellied plover, Pluvialis squatarola 
European golden-plover, Pluvialis apricaria (A) 
American golden-plover, Pluvialis dominica 
Pacific golden-plover, Pluvialis fulva (A) 
Killdeer, Charadrius vociferus 
Common ringed plover, Charadrius hiaticula (A) 
Semipalmated plover, Charadrius semipalmatus 
Piping plover, Charadrius melodus 
Wilson's plover, Charadrius wilsonia (A) 
Snowy plover, Charadrius nivosus (A)

Sandpipers and allies
Order: CharadriiformesFamily: Scolopacidae

Scolopacidae is a large diverse family of small to medium-sized shorebirds including the sandpipers, curlews, godwits, shanks, tattlers, woodcocks, snipes, dowitchers, and phalaropes. The majority of these species eat small invertebrates picked out of the mud or soil. Different lengths of legs and bills enable multiple species to feed in the same habitat, particularly on the coast, without direct competition for food.

Upland sandpiper, Bartramia longicauda (A) 
Whimbrel, Numenius phaeopus 
Eskimo curlew, Numenius borealis (A)  (possibly extinct)
Long-billed curlew, Numenius americanus (A) 
Eurasian curlew, Numenius arquata (A) 
Bar-tailed godwit, Limosa lapponica (A) 
Black-tailed godwit, Limosa limosa (A) 
Hudsonian godwit, Limosa haemastica 
Marbled godwit, Limosa fedoa (A) 
Ruddy turnstone, Arenaria interpres 
Red knot, Calidris canutus 
Ruff, Calidris pugnax (A) 
Broad-billed sandpiper, Calidris falcinellus (A) 
Stilt sandpiper, Calidris himantopus 
Curlew sandpiper, Calidris ferruginea (A) 
Sanderling, Calidris alba 
Dunlin, Calidris alpina 
Purple sandpiper, Calidris maritima 
Baird's sandpiper, Calidris bairdii 
Little stint, Calidris minuta (A) 
Least sandpiper, Calidris minutilla 
White-rumped sandpiper, Calidris fuscicollis 
Buff-breasted sandpiper, Calidris subruficollis 
Pectoral sandpiper, Calidris melanotos  
Semipalmated sandpiper, Calidris pusilla 
Western sandpiper, Calidris mauri (A)  
Short-billed dowitcher, Limnodromus griseus  
Long-billed dowitcher, Limnodromus scolopaceus (A)  
American woodcock, Scolopax minor  
Wilson's snipe, Gallinago delicata  
Spotted sandpiper, Actitis macularia  
Solitary sandpiper, Tringa solitaria  
Lesser yellowlegs, Tringa flavipes  
Willet, Tringa semipalmata  
Spotted redshank, Tringa erythropus (A)  
Common greenshank, Tringa nebularia (A)  
Greater yellowlegs, Tringa melanoleuca     
Common redshank, Tringa totanus (A)  
Wilson's phalarope, Phalaropus tricolor  
Red-necked phalarope, Phalaropus lobatus (A)  
Red phalarope, Phalaropus fulicarius

Skuas and jaegers
Order: CharadriiformesFamily: Stercorariidae

Skuas and Jaegers are in general medium to large birds, typically with grey or brown plumage, often with white markings on the wings. They have longish bills with hooked tips and webbed feet with sharp claws. They look like large dark gulls, but have a fleshy cere above the upper mandible. They are strong, acrobatic fliers.

Great skua, Stercorarius skua (A)  
South polar skua, Stercorarius maccormicki  
Pomarine jaeger, Stercorarius pomarinus  
Parasitic jaeger, Stercorarius parasiticus 
Long-tailed jaeger, Stercorarius longicaudus (A)

Auks, murres, and puffins
Order: CharadriiformesFamily: Alcidae

Alcids are superficially similar to penguins due to their black-and-white colours, their upright posture, and some of their habits, however they are only distantly related to the penguins and are able to fly. Auks live on the open sea, only deliberately coming ashore to nest.

Dovekie, Alle alle 
Common murre, Uria aalge 
Thick-billed murre, Uria lomvia 
Razorbill, Alca torda 
Great auk, Pinguinus impennis 
Black guillemot, Cepphus grylle 
Atlantic puffin, Fratercula arctica

Gulls, terns, and skimmers
Order: CharadriiformesFamily: Laridae

Laridae is a family of medium to large seabirds and includes gulls, terns, kittiwakes, and skimmers. They are typically grey or white, often with black markings on the head or wings. They have stout, longish bills and webbed feet.

Black-legged kittiwake, Rissa tridactyla 
Ivory gull, Pagophila eburnea (A) 
Sabine's gull, Xema sabini (A) 
Bonaparte's gull, Chroicocephalus philadelphia 
Black-headed gull, Chroicocephalus ridibundus 
Little gull, Hydrocoleus minutus (A) 
Ross's gull, Rhodostethia rosea (A) 
Laughing gull, Leucophaeus atricilla (A) 
Franklin's gull, Leucophaeus pipixcan (A) 
Black-tailed gull, Larus crassirostris (A) 
Common gull, Larus canus (A) 
Short-billed gull, Larus brachyrhynchus (A) 
Ring-billed gull, Larus delawarensis 
California gull, Larus californicus (A) 
Herring gull, Larus argentatus 
Iceland gull, Larus glaucoides 
Lesser black-backed gull, Larus fuscus 
Slaty-backed gull, Larus schistisagus (A) 
Glaucous gull, Larus hyperboreus 
Great black-backed gull, Larus marinus 
Kelp gull, Larus dominicanus (A) 
Sooty tern, Onychoprion fuscatus (A) 
Bridled tern, Onychoprion anaethetus (A) 
Least tern, Sternula antillarum (A) 
Gull-billed tern, Gelochelidon nilotica (A) 
Caspian tern, Hydroprogne caspia 
Black tern, Chlidonias niger  
White-winged tern, Chlidonias leucopterus (A) 
Roseate tern, Sterna dougallii 
Arctic tern, Sterna paradisaea 
Forster's tern, Sterna forsteri (A) 
Royal tern, Thalasseus maximus (A) 
Sandwich tern, Thalasseus sandvicensis (A) 
Black skimmer, Rynchops niger (A)

Tropicbirds
Order: PhaethontiformesFamily: Phaethontidae

Tropicbirds are slender white birds of tropical oceans with exceptionally long central tail feathers. Their long wings have black markings, as does the head.

White-tailed tropicbird, Phaethon lepturus (A) 
Red-billed tropicbird, Phaethon aethereus (A)

Loons
Order: GaviiformesFamily: Gaviidae

Loons are aquatic birds, the size of a large duck, to which they are unrelated. Their plumage is largely grey or black, and they have spear-shaped bills. Loons swim well and fly adequately, but are almost hopeless on land, because their legs are placed towards the rear of the body.

Red-throated loon, Gavia stellata 
Pacific loon, Gavia pacifica (A) 
Common loon, Gavia immer

Albatrosses
Order: ProcellariiformesFamily: Diomedeidae

The albatrosses are among the largest of flying birds, and the great albatrosses of the genus Diomedea have the largest wingspans of any extant birds.

Yellow-nosed albatross, Thalassarche chlororhynchos (A) 
Black-browed albatross, Thalassarche melanophris (A)

Southern storm-petrels

Order: ProcellariiformesFamily: Oceanitidae 

The storm-petrels are the smallest seabirds, relatives of the petrels, feeding on planktonic crustaceans and small fish picked from the surface, typically while hovering. The flight is fluttering and sometimes bat-like. Until 2018, this family's three species were included with the other storm-petrels in family Hydrobatidae.

Wilson's storm-petrel, Oceanites oceanicus 
White-faced storm-petrel, Pelagodroma marina (A)

Northern storm-petrels
Order: ProcellariiformesFamily: Hydrobatidae

Though the members of this family are similar in many respects to the southern storm-petrels, including their general appearance and habits, there are enough genetic differences to warrant their placement in a separate family.

European storm-petrel, Hydrobates pelagicus (A) 
Leach's storm-petrel, Hydrobates leucorhous 
Band-rumped storm-petrel, Hydrobates castro (A)

Shearwaters and petrels
Order: ProcellariiformesFamily: Procellariidae

The procellariids are the main group of medium-sized "true petrels", characterized by united nostrils with medium septum and a long outer functional primary.

Northern fulmar, Fulmarus glacialis 
Bermuda petrel, Pterodroma cahow (A) 
Black-capped petrel, Pterodroma hasitata (A) 
Fea's petrel, Pterodroma feae (A) 
Cory's shearwater, Calonectris diomedea 
Sooty shearwater, Ardenna griseus 
Great shearwater, Ardenna gravis 
Manx shearwater, Puffinus puffinus 
Audubon's shearwater, Puffinus lherminieri (A) 
Barolo shearwater, Puffinus baroli (A)

Storks
Order: CiconiiformesFamily: Ciconiidae

Storks are large, heavy, long-legged, long-necked wading birds with long stout bills and wide wingspans. They lack the powder down that other wading birds such as herons, spoonbills and ibises use to clean off fish slime. Storks lack a pharynx and are mute.

Wood stork, Mycteria americana (A)

Frigatebirds
Order: SuliformesFamily: Fregatidae

Frigatebirds are large seabirds usually found over tropical oceans. They are large, black, or black-and-white, with long wings and deeply forked tails. The males have coloured inflatable throat pouches. They do not swim or walk and cannot take off from a flat surface. Having the largest wingspan-to-body-weight ratio of any bird, they are essentially aerial, able to stay aloft for more than a week.

Magnificent frigatebird, Fregata magnificens (A)

Boobies and gannets
Order: SuliformesFamily: Sulidae

The sulids comprise the gannets and boobies. Both groups are medium-large coastal seabirds that plunge-dive for fish.

Masked booby, Sula dactylatra (A) 
Brown booby, Sula leucogaster (A) 
Red-footed booby, Sula sula (A) 
Northern gannet, Morus bassanus

Cormorants and shags
Order: SuliformesFamily: Phalacrocoracidae

Cormorants are medium-to-large aquatic birds, usually with mainly dark plumage and areas of coloured skin on the face. The bill is long, thin, and sharply hooked. Their feet are four-toed and webbed.

Great cormorant, Phalacrocorax carbo 
Double-crested cormorant, Nannopterum auritum

Pelicans
Order: PelecaniformesFamily: Pelecanidae

Pelicans are very large water birds with a distinctive pouch under their beak. Like other birds in the order Pelecaniformes, they have four webbed toes.

American white pelican, Pelecanus erythrorhynchos (A) 
Brown pelican, Pelecanus occidentalis (A)

Herons, egrets, and bitterns
Order: PelecaniformesFamily: Ardeidae

The family Ardeidae contains the herons, egrets, and bitterns. Herons and egrets are medium to large wading birds with long necks and legs. Bitterns tend to be shorter necked and more secretive. Members of Ardeidae fly with their necks retracted, unlike other long-necked birds such as storks, ibises, and spoonbills.

American bittern, Botaurus lentiginosus 
Least bittern, Ixobrychus exilis (A) 
Great blue heron, Ardea herodias 
Grey heron, Ardea cinerea (A) 
Great egret, Ardea alba 
Little egret, Egretta garzetta (A) 
Western reef-heron, Egretta gularis (A) 
Snowy egret, Egretta thula 
Little blue heron, Egretta caerulea 
Tricolored heron, Egretta tricolor (A) 
Reddish egret, Egretta rufescens (A) 
Cattle egret, Bubulcus ibis (A) 
Green heron, Butorides virescens (A) 
Black-crowned night-heron, Nycticorax nycticorax 
Yellow-crowned night-heron, Nyctanassa violacea (A)

Ibises and spoonbills
Order: PelecaniformesFamily: Threskiornithidae

The family Threskiornithidae includes the ibises and spoonbills. They have long, broad wings. Their bodies tend to be elongated, the neck more so, with rather long legs. The bill is also long, decurved in the case of the ibises, straight and distinctively flattened in the spoonbills.

White ibis, Eudocimus albus (A) 
Glossy ibis, Plegadis falcinellus (A) 
White-faced ibis, Plegadis chihi (A)

New World vultures
Order: CathartiformesFamily: Cathartidae

The New World vultures are not closely related to Old World vultures, but superficially resemble them because of convergent evolution. Like the Old World vultures, they are scavengers. However, unlike Old World vultures, which find carcasses by sight, New World vultures have a good sense of smell with which they locate carcasses.

Black vulture, Coragyps atratus (A) 
Turkey vulture, Cathartes aura

Osprey
Order: AccipitriformesFamily: Pandionidae

Pandionidae is a family of fish-eating birds of prey possessing a very large, powerful hooked beak for tearing flesh from their prey, strong legs, powerful talons, and keen eyesight. The family is monotypic.

Osprey, Pandion haliaetus

Hawks, eagles, and kites
Order: AccipitriformesFamily: Accipitridae

Accipitridae is a family of birds of prey which includes hawks, eagles, kites, harriers, and Old World vultures. These birds have very large powerful hooked beaks for tearing flesh from their prey, strong legs, powerful talons, and keen eyesight.

Swallow-tailed kite, Elanoides forficatus (A) 
Golden eagle, Aquila chrysaetos (A) 
Northern harrier, Circus hudsonius 
Sharp-shinned hawk, Accipiter striatus 
Cooper's hawk, Accipiter cooperii (A) 
Northern goshawk, Accipiter gentilis 
Bald eagle, Haliaeetus leucocephalus 
Steller's sea-eagle, Haliaeetus pelagicus (A) 
Mississippi kite, Ictinia mississippiensis (A) 
Red-shouldered hawk, Buteo lineatus (A) 
Broad-winged hawk, Buteo platypterus 
Swainson's hawk, Buteo swainsoni (A) 
Zone-tailed hawk, Buteo albonotatus (A) 
Red-tailed hawk, Buteo jamaicensis 
Rough-legged hawk, Buteo lagopus

Barn-owls
Order: StrigiformesFamily: Tytonidae

Owls in the family Tytonidae are medium to large owls with large heads and characteristic heart-shaped faces.

Barn owl, Tyto alba (A)

Owls
Order: StrigiformesFamily: Strigidae

Typical owls are small to large solitary nocturnal birds of prey. They have large forward-facing eyes and ears, a hawk-like beak, and a conspicuous circle of feathers around each eye called a facial disk.

Eastern screech-owl, Megascops asio (A) 
Great horned owl, Bubo virginianus 
Snowy owl, Bubo scandiacus 
Northern hawk owl, Surnia ulula (A) 
Burrowing owl, Athene cunicularia (A) 
Barred owl, Strix varia 
Great grey owl, Strix nebulosa (A) 
Long-eared owl, Asio otus (A) 
Short-eared owl, Asio flammeus 
Boreal owl, Aegolius funereus (A) 
Northern saw-whet owl, Aegolius acadicus

Kingfishers
Order: CoraciiformesFamily: Alcedinidae

Kingfishers are medium-sized birds with large heads, long, pointed bills, short legs, and stubby tails.

Belted kingfisher, Megaceryle alcyon

Woodpeckers
Order: PiciformesFamily: Picidae

Woodpeckers are small to medium-sized birds with chisel-like beaks, short legs, stiff tails, and long tongues used for capturing insects. Some species have feet with two toes pointing forward and two backward, while several species have only three toes. Many woodpeckers have the habit of tapping noisily on tree trunks with their beaks.

Lewis's woodpecker, Melanerpes lewis (A) 
Red-headed woodpecker, Melanerpes erythrocephalus (A) 
Red-bellied woodpecker, Melanerpes carolinus 
Yellow-bellied sapsucker, Sphyrapicus varius 
American three-toed woodpecker, Picoides dorsalis (A) 
Black-backed woodpecker, Picoides arcticus 
Downy woodpecker, Dryobates pubescens 
Hairy woodpecker, Dryobates villosus 
Northern flicker, Colaptes auratus 
Pileated woodpecker, Dryocopus pileatus

Falcons and caracaras
Order: FalconiformesFamily: Falconidae

Falconidae is a family of diurnal birds of prey, notably the falcons and caracaras. They differ from hawks, eagles, and kites in that they kill with their beaks instead of their talons.

Crested caracara, Caracara plancus (A) 
Eurasian kestrel, Falco tinnunculus (C) 
American kestrel, Falco sparverius 
Merlin, Falco columbarius 
Gyrfalcon, Falco rusticolus 
Peregrine falcon, Falco peregrinus

Tyrant flycatchers
Order: PasseriformesFamily: Tyrannidae

Tyrant flycatchers are Passerine birds which occur throughout North and South America. They superficially resemble the Old World flycatchers, but are more robust and have stronger bills. They do not have the sophisticated vocal capabilities of the songbirds. Most, but not all, are rather plain. As the name implies, most are insectivorous.

Ash-throated flycatcher, Myiarchus cinerascens (A) 
Great crested flycatcher, Myiarchus crinitus (A) 
Sulphur-bellied flycatcher, Myiodynastes luteiventris (A) 
Tropical kingbird, Tyrannus melancholicus (A) 
Cassin's kingbird, Tyrannus vociferans (A) 
Western kingbird, Tyrannus verticalis (A) 
Eastern kingbird, Tyrannus tyrannus 
Grey kingbird, Tyrannus dominicensis (A) 
Scissor-tailed flycatcher, Tyrannus forficatus (A) 
Fork-tailed flycatcher, Tyrannus savana (A) 
Olive-sided flycatcher, Contopus cooperi 
Western wood-pewee, Contopus sordidulus (A) 
Eastern wood-pewee, Contopus virens 
Yellow-bellied flycatcher, Empidonax flaviventris 
Acadian flycatcher, Empidonax virescens (A) 
Alder flycatcher, Empidonax alnorum 
Willow flycatcher, Empidonax traillii (A) 
Least flycatcher, Empidonax minimus 
Hammond's flycatcher, Empidonax hammondii (A) 
Dusky flycatcher, Empidonax oberholseri (A) 
Pacific-slope flycatcher, Empidonax difficilis (A) 
Eastern phoebe, Sayornis phoebe 
Say's phoebe, Sayornis saya (A) 
Vermilion flycatcher, Pyrocephalus rubinus (A)

Vireos, shrike-babblers, and erpornis
Order: PasseriformesFamily: Vireonidae

The vireos are a group of small to medium-sized passerine birds mostly restricted to the New World, though a few other members of the family are found in Asia. They are typically greenish in colour and resemble wood warblers apart from their heavier bills.

White-eyed vireo, Vireo griseus (A) 
Bell's vireo, Vireo bellii (A) 
Yellow-throated vireo, Vireo flavifrons (A) 
Blue-headed vireo, Vireo solitarius 
Plumbeous vireo, Vireo plumbeus (A) 
Philadelphia vireo, Vireo philadelphicus 
Warbling vireo, Vireo gilvus (A) 
Red-eyed vireo, Vireo olivaceus

Shrikes
Order: PasseriformesFamily: Laniidae

Shrikes are passerine birds known for their habit of catching other birds and small animals and impaling the uneaten portions of their bodies on thorns. A shrike's beak is hooked, like that of a typical bird of prey.

Brown shrike, Lanius cristatus (A) 
Loggerhead shrike, Lanius ludovicianus (A) 
Northern shrike, Lanius borealis

Crows, jays, and magpies
Order: PasseriformesFamily: Corvidae

The family Corvidae includes crows, ravens, jays, choughs, magpies, treepies, nutcrackers, and ground jays. Corvids are above average in size among the Passeriformes, and some of the larger species show high levels of intelligence.

Canada jay, Perisoreus canadensis 
Blue jay, Cyanocitta cristata 
Black-billed magpie, Pica hudsonia (A) 
Eurasian jackdaw, Corvus monedula (A) 
American crow, Corvus brachyrhynchos 
Fish crow, Corvus ossifragus (A) 
Common raven, Corvus corax

Tits, chickadees, and titmice
Order: PasseriformesFamily: Paridae

The Paridae are mainly small stocky woodland species with short stout bills. Some have crests. They are adaptable birds, with a mixed diet including seeds and insects.

Black-capped chickadee, Poecile atricapilla 
Boreal chickadee, Poecile hudsonica

Larks
Order: PasseriformesFamily: Alaudidae

Larks are small terrestrial birds with often extravagant songs and display flights. Most larks are fairly dull in appearance. Their food is insects and seeds.

Horned lark, Eremophila alpestris

Swallows
Order: PasseriformesFamily: Hirundinidae

The family Hirundinidae is adapted to aerial feeding. They have a slender streamlined body, long pointed wings, and a short bill with a wide gape. The feet are adapted to perching rather than walking, and the front toes are partially joined at the base.

Bank swallow, Riparia riparia 
Tree swallow, Tachycineta bicolor 
Violet-green swallow, Tachycineta thalassina (A) 
Northern rough-winged swallow, Stelgidopteryx serripennis (A) 
Purple martin, Progne subis (A) 
Barn swallow, Hirundo rustica 
Cliff swallow, Petrochelidon pyrrhonota 
Cave swallow, Petrochelidon fulva (A)

Kinglets
Order: PasseriformesFamily: Regulidae

The kinglets are a small family of birds which resemble the titmice. They are very small insectivorous birds. The adults have coloured crowns, giving rise to their name.

Ruby-crowned kinglet, Corthylio calendula 
Golden-crowned kinglet, Regulus satrapa

Waxwings
Order: PasseriformesFamily: Bombycillidae

The waxwings are a group of passerine birds with soft silky plumage and unique red tips to some of the wing feathers. In the Bohemian and cedar waxwings, these tips look like sealing wax and give the group its name. These are arboreal birds of northern forests. They live on insects in summer and berries in winter.

Bohemian waxwing, Bombycilla garrulus 
Cedar waxwing, Bombycilla cedrorum

Nuthatches
Order: PasseriformesFamily: Sittidae

Nuthatches are small woodland birds. They have the unusual ability to climb down trees head first, unlike other birds which can only go upwards. Nuthatches have big heads, short tails, and powerful bills and feet.

Red-breasted nuthatch, Sitta canadensis 
White-breasted nuthatch, Sitta carolinensis

Treecreepers
Order: PasseriformesFamily: Certhiidae

Treecreepers are small woodland birds, brown above and white below. They have thin pointed down-curved bills, which they use to extricate insects from bark. They have stiff tail feathers, like woodpeckers, which they use to support themselves on vertical trees.

Brown creeper, Certhia americana

Gnatcatchers
Order: PasseriformesFamily: Polioptilidae

These dainty birds resemble Old World warblers in their structure and habits, moving restlessly through the foliage seeking insects. The gnatcatchers are mainly soft bluish grey in colour and have the typical insectivore's long sharp bill. Many species have distinctive black head patterns (especially males) and long, regularly cocked, black-and-white tails.

Blue-grey gnatcatcher, Polioptila caerulea (A)

Wrens
Order: PasseriformesFamily: Troglodytidae

Wrens are small and inconspicuous birds, except for their loud songs. They have short wings and thin down-turned bills. Several species often hold their tails upright. All are insectivorous.

Rock wren, Salpinctes obsoletus (A) 
House wren, Troglodytes aedon (A) 
Winter wren, Troglodytes hiemalis 
Sedge wren, Cistothorus platensis (A) 
Marsh wren, Cistothorus palustris (A) 
Carolina wren, Thryothorus ludovicianus (A) 
Bewick's wren, Thryomanes bewickii (A)

Mockingbirds and thrashers
Order: PasseriformesFamily: Mimidae

The mimids are a family of passerine birds which includes thrashers, mockingbirds, tremblers, and the New World catbirds. These birds are notable for their vocalization, especially their remarkable ability to mimic a wide variety of birds and other sounds heard outdoors. The species tend towards dull greys and browns in their appearance.

Grey catbird, Dumetella carolinensis 
Brown thrasher, Toxostoma rufum (A) 
Northern mockingbird, Mimus polyglottos

Starlings
Order: PasseriformesFamily: Sturnidae

Starlings and mynas are small to medium-sized Old World passerine birds with strong feet. Their flight is strong and direct and most are very gregarious. Their preferred habitat is fairly open country, and they eat insects and fruit. The plumage of several species is dark with a metallic sheen.

European starling, Sturnus vulgaris (I)

Thrushes and allies
Order: PasseriformesFamily: Turdidae

The thrushes are a group of passerine birds that occur mainly but not exclusively in the Old World. They are plump, soft plumaged, small to medium-sized insectivores or sometimes omnivores, often feeding on the ground. Many have attractive songs.

Eastern bluebird, Sialia sialis 
Mountain bluebird, Sialia currucoides (A) 
Townsend's solitaire, Myadestes townsendi (A) 
Veery, Catharus fuscescens 
Grey-cheeked thrush, Catharus minimus (A) 
Bicknell's thrush, Catharus bicknelli (A) 
Swainson's thrush, Catharus ustulatus 
Hermit thrush, Catharus guttatus 
Wood thrush, Hylocichla mustelina (A) 
Fieldfare, Turdus pilaris (A) 
Redwing, Turdus iliacus (A) 
American robin, Turdus migratorius 
Varied thrush, Ixoreus naevius (A)

Old World flycatchers
Order: PasseriformesFamily: Muscicapidae

The Old World flycatchers are a large family of small passerine birds. These are mainly small arboreal insectivores, many of which, as the name implies, take their prey on the wing.

Northern wheatear, Oenanthe oenanthe (A)

Old World sparrows
Order: PasseriformesFamily: Passeridae

Old World sparrows are small passerine birds. In general, sparrows tend to be small plump brownish or greyish birds with short tails and short powerful beaks. Sparrows are seed eaters, but they also consume small insects.

House sparrow, Passer domesticus (I)

Wagtails and pipits
Order: PasseriformesFamily: Motacillidae

Motacillidae is a family of small passerine birds with medium to long tails. They include the wagtails, longclaws and pipits. They are slender ground-feeding insectivores of open country.

American pipit, Anthus rubescens

Finches, euphonias, and allies
Order: PasseriformesFamily: Fringillidae

Finches are seed-eating passerine birds, that are small to moderately large and have a strong beak, usually conical and in some species very large. All have twelve tail feathers and nine primaries. These birds have a bouncing flight with alternating bouts of flapping and gliding on closed wings, and most sing well.

Common chaffinch, Fringilla coelebs (A) 
Brambling, Fringilla montifringilla (A) 
Evening grosbeak, Coccothraustes vespertinus 
Pine grosbeak, Pinicola enucleator 
House finch, Haemorhous mexicanus (I) 
Purple finch, Haemorhous purpureus 
Common redpoll, Acanthis flammea 
Hoary redpoll, Acanthis hornemanni (A) 
Red crossbill, Loxia curvirostra 
White-winged crossbill, Loxia leucoptera 
Pine siskin, Spinus pinus 
American goldfinch, Spinus tristis

Longspurs and snow buntings
Order: PasseriformesFamily: Calcariidae

The Calcariidae are a group of passerine birds that were traditionally grouped with the New World sparrows, but differ in a number of respects and are usually found in open grassy areas.

Lapland longspur, Calcarius lapponicus 
Chestnut-collared longspur, Calcarius ornatus (A) 
Smith's longspur, Calcarius pictus (A) 
Snow bunting, Plectrophenax nivalis

New World sparrows
Order: PasseriformesFamily: Passerellidae

Until 2017, these species were considered part of the family Emberizidae. Most of the species are known as sparrows, but these birds are not closely related to the Old World sparrows which are in the family Passeridae. Many of these have distinctive head patterns.

Cassin's sparrow, Peucaea cassinii (A) 
Grasshopper sparrow, Ammodramus savannarum (A) 
Lark sparrow, Chondestes grammacus (A) 
Lark bunting, Calamospiza melanocorys (A) 
Chipping sparrow, Spizella passerina 
Clay-coloured sparrow, Spizella pallida (A) 
Field sparrow, Spizella pusilla (A) 
Brewer's sparrow, Spizella breweri (A) 
Fox sparrow, Passerella iliaca 
American tree sparrow, Spizelloides arborea 
Dark-eyed junco, Junco hyemalis 
White-crowned sparrow, Zonotrichia leucophrys 
Golden-crowned sparrow, Zonotrichia atricapilla (A) 
Harris's sparrow, Zonotrichia querula (A) 
White-throated sparrow, Zonotrichia albicollis 
Sagebrush sparrow, Artemisiospiza nevadensis (A) 
Bell's sparrow, Artemisiospiza belli (A) 
Vesper sparrow, Pooecetes gramineus (A) 
LeConte's sparrow, Ammospiza leconteii (A) 
Seaside sparrow, Ammospiza maritima (A) 
Nelson's sparrow, Ammospiza nelsoni 
Saltmarsh sparrow, Ammospiza caudacuta (A) 
Henslow's sparrow, Centronyx henslowii (A) 
Savannah sparrow, Passerculus sandwichensis 
Song sparrow, Melospiza melodia 
Lincoln's sparrow, Melospiza lincolnii 
Swamp sparrow, Melospiza georgiana 
Green-tailed towhee, Pipilo chlorurus (A) 
Spotted towhee, Pipilo maculatus  (A) 
Eastern towhee, Pipilo erythrophthalmus (A)

Yellow-breasted chat
Order: PasseriformesFamily: Icteriidae

This species was historically placed in the wood-warblers (Parulidae) but nonetheless most authorities were unsure if it belonged there. It was placed in its own family in 2017.

Yellow-breasted chat, Icteria virens (A)

Troupials and allies
Order: PasseriformesFamily: Icteridae

The icterids are a group of small to medium-sized, often colourful passerine birds restricted to the New World and include the grackles, New World blackbirds, and New World orioles. Most species have black as a predominant plumage colour, often enlivened by yellow, orange, or red.

Yellow-headed blackbird, Xanthocephalus xanthocephalus 
Bobolink, Dolichonyx oryzivorus 
Eastern meadowlark, Sturnella magna 
Western meadowlark, Sturnella neglecta (A) 
Orchard oriole, Icterus spurius 
Hooded oriole, Icterus cucullatus (A) 
Bullock's oriole, Icterus bullockii (A) 
Baltimore oriole, Icterus galbula 
Red-winged blackbird, Agelaius phoeniceus 
Shiny cowbird, Molothrus bonariensis (A) 
Bronzed cowbird, Molothrus aeneus (A) 
Brown-headed cowbird, Molothrus ater 
Rusty blackbird, Euphagus carolinus 
Brewer's blackbird, Euphagus cyanocephalus (A) 
Common grackle, Quiscalus quiscula 
Boat-tailed grackle, Quiscalus major (A) 
Great-tailed grackle, Quiscalus mexicanus (A)

New World warblers
Order: PasseriformesFamily: Parulidae

The wood-warblers are a group of small, often colourful, passerine birds restricted to the New World. Most are arboreal, but some are more terrestrial. Most members of this family are insectivores.

Ovenbird, Seiurus aurocapilla 
Worm-eating warbler, Helmitheros vermivorum (A) 
Louisiana waterthrush, Parkesia motacilla (A) 
Northern waterthrush, Parkesia noveboracensis 
Golden-winged warbler, Vermivora chrysoptera (A) 
Blue-winged warbler, Vermivora cyanoptera (A) 
Black-and-white warbler, Mniotilta varia 
Prothonotary warbler, Protonotaria citrea (A) 
Swainson's warbler, Limnothlypis swainsonii (A) 
Tennessee warbler, Leiothlypis peregrina 
Orange-crowned warbler, Leiothlypis celata 
Nashville warbler, Leiothlypis ruficapilla 
Virginia's warbler, Leiothlypis virginiae (A) 
Connecticut warbler, Oporornis agilis (A) 
MacGillivray's warbler, Geothlypis tolmiei (A) 
Mourning warbler, Geothlypis philadelphia 
Kentucky warbler, Geothlypis formosa (A) 
Common yellowthroat, Geothlypis trichas 
Hooded warbler, Setophaga citrina (A) 
American redstart, Setophaga ruticilla 
Cape May warbler, Setophaga tigrina 
Cerulean warbler, Setophaga cerulea (A) 
Northern parula, Setophaga americana 
Magnolia warbler, Setophaga magnolia 
Bay-breasted warbler, Setophaga castanea 
Blackburnian warbler, Setophaga fusca 
Yellow warbler, Setophaga petechia 
Chestnut-sided warbler, Setophaga pensylvanica 
Blackpoll warbler, Setophaga striata 
Black-throated blue warbler, Setophaga caerulescens 
Palm warbler, Setophaga palmarum 
Pine warbler, Setophaga pinus 
Yellow-rumped warbler, Setophaga coronata 
Yellow-throated warbler, Setophaga dominica (A) 
Prairie warbler, Setophaga discolor 
Black-throated grey warbler, Setophaga nigrescens (A) 
Townsend's warbler, Setophaga townsendi (A) 
Hermit warbler, Setophaga occidentalis (A) 
Black-throated green warbler, Setophaga virens 
Canada warbler, Cardellina canadensis 
Wilson's warbler, Cardellina pusilla

Cardinals and allies
Order: PasseriformesFamily: Cardinalidae

The cardinals are a family of robust, seed-eating birds with strong bills. They are typically associated with open woodland. The sexes usually have distinct plumages.

Summer tanager, Piranga rubra (A) 
Scarlet tanager, Piranga olivacea (A) 
Western tanager, Piranga ludoviciana (A) 
Northern cardinal, Cardinalis cardinalis 
Rose-breasted grosbeak, Pheucticus ludovicianus 
Black-headed grosbeak, Pheucticus melanocephalus  
Blue grosbeak, Passerina caerulea (A) 
Lazuli bunting, Passerina amoena (A) 
Indigo bunting, Passerina cyanea 
Painted bunting, Passerina ciris (A) 
Dickcissel, Spiza americana (A)

Notes

References

See also
List of birds
Lists of birds by region

Nova Scotia
Birds